Puesto Sey is a rural municipality and village in Jujuy Province in Argentina.

References

Populated places in Jujuy Province